The statutes of uncertain date, also known as statuta incerti temporis or Certain Statutes made during the Reigns of K. Henry 3. K. Edward 1. or K. Edward 2. but uncertain when or in which of their times, are British (previously English) statutes dating from the reigns of Henry III, Edward I or Edward II, and frequently listed in the statute books at the end of the reign of Edward II.

See also
List of Acts of the Parliament of England to 1483
Weights and Measures Act

References

Further reading
Great Britain, William Paterson, 1863, The practical statutes of the session, Law Times Office, p. 379

English laws